This is a complete list of clubs that have competed in the first-grade Rugby League football competition in Australia that began with the New South Wales Rugby Football League (NSWRFL) competition in 1908. The NSWRL (having dropped the word Football from their name in the 1980s) ran the competition until the end of the 1994 season, when the sport's national governing body, the Australian Rugby League (ARL), took over. However a rival competition was being planned and the only season of the News Limited-owned Super League competition (SL) was held in 1997. The two competitions were reunited as the National Rugby League (NRL) in time for the start of the 1998 season. The NRL was established as a company owned in partnership between the ARL and News Limited. In 2013 the ARL was reconstituted as the Australian Rugby League Commission (ARLC) and News Limited handed their 50% stake in the NRL back to the governing body.

There have been thirty-three teams which have competed in all of the first-grade competitions since 1908, of which seventeen remain in this competition. There were nine foundation clubs, which began in 1908, however over the next eighty years, the NSWRL only ever expanded into the Sydney region which included eight new teams while five clubs left the competition. This changed in 1982 when a Wollongong club and a Canberra based team joined. In 1988 teams from outside New South Wales began to enter the premiership. With the Super League war, the two rival competitions, the ARL and SL, had twenty-two teams competing in the 1997 season. As part of the agreement for the NRL, the competition would be forced to reduce to only fourteen teams in 2000.

There are ten teams from the state of NSW, four from Queensland, one from the Australian Capital Territory, one from Victoria and one from the neighbouring country New Zealand.

Of the thirty-three clubs that have participated in the competition, the majority have called Sydney home: Seventeen clubs have been based exclusively in Sydney, while two have split their home games between Sydney and elsewhere as joint-ventures. A majority of clubs have also been from New South Wales, the state being home to twenty-three of the competition's thirty-three clubs. Of the remaining clubs, five have been from the state of Queensland, and there has been one each from the states of South Australia, Victoria, Western Australia, the Australian Capital Territory, and the nation of New Zealand.

Foundation clubs

Two current NRL clubs have existed since the 1908 foundation of the NSWRFL, the predecessor of the NRL. These clubs are the South Sydney Rabbitohs and the Sydney Roosters (founded as 'Eastern Suburbs'). South Sydney is the oldest current club in the League, having been established a week earlier than "Easts". A further two Foundation clubs, the Balmain Tigers and the Western Suburbs Magpies, formed a joint-venture club in the wake of the Super League war, and since the start of the 2000 season have competed in the NRL as Wests Tigers. However, Balmain and Western Suburbs still compete separately in lower-grade competitions and Junior representative football. Foundation clubs Newtown and North Sydney have been excluded from the competition due to their weak financial positions, however both clubs continue and are still (2015) competing in the second-tier NSW Cup and Juniors. Glebe are also currently competing in the Ron Massey Cup. Meanwhile, Cumberland are long-since defunct, while the Newcastle Rebels, after playing all the 1908 season "away" ( i.e. in Sydney ) and only getting three home games in 1909, withdrew from the NSWRFL competition to establish the Newcastle Rugby League. There is no direct connection between the Newcastle Rebels and today's Newcastle Knights, so the current Newcastle club is not considered to be a Foundation club.

Clubs

Bold indicates the team is still competing as of the 2023 season

^Now compete as a joint venture

^^Have competed as a joint venture

**Dolphins colours will also include gold when they join the NRL in 2023

See also

References

Australian rugby league lists
Lists of rugby league clubs
National Rugby League lists